Albert Levame (19 January 1881 –  5 December 1958) was a Monagasque prelate of the Catholic Church who worked in the diplomatic service of the Holy See.

Biography
Albert Levame was born in Monaco on 19 January 1881. He studied at the Jesuit College of the Visitation there and then at the Pontifical Gregorian University in Rome. He was ordained a priest on 21 May 1905. 

To prepare for a diplomatic career he entered the Pontifical Ecclesiastical Academy in 1907. He early postings included stints in Vienna, Prague, Buenos Aires, and Paris.

On 21 December 1933, Pope Pius XI named him a titular archbishop of Chersonesus in Zechia and Apostolic Nuncio to El Salvador and to Honduras. He received his episcopal consecration from Cardinal Eugenio Pacelli on 4 February 1934.

On 12 November 1939, Pope Pius XII named him nuncio to Uruguay and to Paraguay. He resigned from the Paraguay position in 1941.

On 3 October 1949, Pope Pius appointed him  Apostolic Internuncio to Egypt. There he took part in the negotiations that resolved the controversy over the teaching of the Christian religion in schools.

He was named Apostolic Nuncio to Ireland on 16 June 1954.

He died in the nunciature in Dublin on 5 December 1958. He had been ill for several months.

References

External links 
Catholic Hierarchy: Archbishop Albert Levame

Apostolic Nuncios to El Salvador
Apostolic Nuncios to Honduras
Apostolic Nuncios to Egypt
Apostolic Nuncios to Uruguay
Apostolic Nuncios to Paraguay
Apostolic Nuncios to Ireland
1958 deaths
1881 births